Callejón is Spanish for "alley, side street" and may refer to:

Surname
Eduardo Propper de Callejón (1895–1972), Spanish diplomat who helped Jews flee from Occupied France during World War 2
José María Callejón (born 1987), Spanish football forward
Juanmi Callejón (born 1987), Spanish football midfielder

Places
Callejón de Conchucos, valley in the Cordillera Blanca mountain range in the Ancash region of Peru
Callejón de Huaylas, valley in the Ancash Region in the north-central highlands of Peru
Callejón Diamante (Diamond Alley), central street in the city of Xalapa in Veracruz state, Mexico

Other
El callejón de los milagros, 1994 Mexican film written by Vicente Leñero
Callejon (band), a German metalcore band